GolemLabs is a Canadian video game developer based in Sherbrooke. The company was founded in 2000.

Games developed

References

External links 
 

Companies based in Quebec
Video game companies of Canada
Video game development companies